Sophie Louise Balinska-Jundzillova (born 14 May 1977) is an English model and reality television personality.

Her modelling career included a campaign for Gossard bras in 1996, and later included appearances for a range of other brands. Since 2000 she has also appeared in television programmes including I'm a Celebrity...Get Me Out of Here! and Celebrity Big Brother.

Career 
Anderton was born in Bristol, England. In 1996 she appeared in the Gossard Glossies and Gossard Wonderbra "Girl in the grass" national advertising campaign shot by Herb Ritts, which included the strapline "Who said a woman couldn't get pleasure from something soft?" The campaign attracted a record number of complaints (321) to the Advertising Standards Authority, none of which were upheld.

Anderton has modeled for Gossard (1998), the Flora London Marathon, British Berries summer fruits (2006), Maxim, Peacocks and La Senza and graced the cover of British GQ.

In 2004, Anderton was a contestant on the fourth series of ITV's I'm a Celebrity...Get Me Out of Here!. She appeared in the TV series Simply the Best and a celebrity edition of the UK version of Fear Factor.  In 2005, she appeared on the programme Cold Turkey, which documented her attempts to quit smoking cigarettes; she later became a representative for a smoking cessation program called QS7D (Quit Smoking in 7 Days).

In 2006, Anderton was a contestant on ITV's Love Island. In the same year, she appeared on Sky1's Cirque de Celebrité but withdrew after sustaining ligament damage.

In August 2013, Anderton became a housemate on the twelfth series of Celebrity Big Brother. She was eliminated from competition in an episode that aired on 3 September 2013.

Personal life 

From 2004 until 2007, Anderton was a Patron of the original Action on Addiction in London, a charity and addiction research center investigating drug and alcohol dependence.

In 2011, Anderton told the Belfast Telegraph that she had been misdiagnosed and treated for bipolar disorder in 2006. She said, "I had depression. They wrongly diagnosed me and put me on a bucket load of blood pills. It was absolutely bonkers."

In June 2009, Anderton complained to the police about dozens of text messages left on her mobile phone. A man was eventually charged with harassment and, in March 2010, convicted.

In an August 2013 interview, conducted just before she entered the house for her participation in Celebrity Big Brother 12, Anderton acknowledged past difficulties with substance abuse.

In August 2021, Anderton married Count Kazimierz Balinski-Jundzill, the father of Ella Balinska.

Film and television

Film 
 Popcorn (2007) as "Female Killer"

Television appearances 
 The Late Late Show (2004)
 Hell's Kitchen (2004)
 Celebrity Fear Factor UK (2004)
 Simply the Best (2004)
 I'm a Celebrity... Get Me Out of Here! (2004)
 GMTV (2004)
 Big Brother's Efourum" (2004, 2005)
 This Morning (2004, 2006)
 Taste (2005)
 1 Leicester Square (2006)
 Celebrity Love Island (2006)
 Friday Night with Jonathan Ross (2006)
 Tubridy Tonight (2006)
 Loose Women (2007)
 Alan Carr's Celebrity Ding Dong (2008)
 The Jeremy Kyle Show (2009)
 Total Wipeout (2012)
 Celebrity Big Brother 12'' (2013)

References

External links 
 
 
 

1977 births
Living people
Television personalities from Bristol
English female models

People educated at Bristol Cathedral Choir School
People educated at Redland High School for Girls
I'm a Celebrity...Get Me Out of Here! (British TV series) participants